Theodosius (Latinized from the Greek "Θεοδόσιος", Theodosios, "given by god") is a given name. It may take the form Teodósio, Teodosie, Teodosije etc.  Theodosia is a feminine version of the name.

Emperors of ancient Rome and Byzantium
Theodosius I (347–395; "Theodosius the Great"), son of Count Theodosius
Theodosius II (408–450)
Theodosius III (715–717)
Theodosius (son of Maurice) (583/585–602), eldest son and co-emperor of the Byzantine emperor Maurice

Popes of the Coptic Orthodox Church
Pope Theodosius I of Alexandria (d. 566)
Pope Theodosius II of Alexandria (d. 742)
Pope Theodosius III of Alexandria (d. 1300)

Patriarchs of Alexandria
Patriarch Theodosius I of Alexandria (535–567)
Patriarch Theodosius II of Alexandria (12th century)

Other clergy and monastics
In chronological order:
Theodosius, bishop of Philadelphia in Lydia, deposed at the Council of Seleucia, 359
Theodosius the Cenobiarch (c. 423–529), a monk, abbot, and saint, founder and of the cenobitic way of monastic life
Theodosius, archdeacon and pilgrim to the Holy Land, author of De Situ Terrae Sanctae ca. 518-530
Theodosius the Deacon, 10th-century Byzantine poet who wrote the poem "The Conquest of Crete"
Theodosius of Kiev, 11th-century Russian saint
Theodosius, Metropolitan of Moscow (1461–1464)
Theodosius Florentini (1808–1865), Swiss Capuchin friar, a founder of Catholic religious orders
Teodósio de Gouveia (1889-1962), Portuguese cardinal, served as archbishop in Mozambique (1940-1962)
Theodosius (Lazor) (1933–2020), Metropolitan/primate of the Orthodox Church in America (1977-2002)
Theodosios (Hanna) (1965– ), Greek Orthodox Archbishop of Sebastia (2005-)

Dukes of Braganza
Teodósio I, Duke of Braganza (1510–1563), 5th Duke of Braganza
Teodósio II, Duke of Braganza (1558–1630), 7th Duke of Braganza
Teodósio, Prince of Brazil (1634–1653), 9th Duke of Braganza and 1st Prince of Brazil

Others
In chronological order:
Theodosius of Bithynia or Theodosius of Tripolis (c. 160 BC – c. 100 BC), Greek astronomer and mathematician
Theodosius, godson of Belisarius (c. 505–565) and Antonina
 Theodosius (play), 1680 tragedy by Nathaniel Lee

First name
Theodosius Keene, an 18th-century English architect
Theodosio De Stefani Perez (1853-1935), Italian naturalist and entomologist
Theodosius Dobzhansky (1900–1975), noted geneticist and evolutionary biologist

See also
Ataullah or Atallah, Arabic name with similar meaning, used by Muslims and sometimes also by Christians
Teodosie (name)
Teodosije (disambiguation)